Wild Romance may refer to:-

Wild Romance (band), also known as Herman Brood & his Wild Romance, backing band of Dutch singer-pianist Herman Brood
Wild Romance (film), a 2006 biopic about Dutch singer and artist Herman Brood
Wild Romance (novel), by Chloe Schama
Wild Romance (TV series), a 2012 South Korean drama series
A Wild Romance, a 1983 album by The Twins